Notadusta is an extinct genus of sea snails, marine gastropod mollusks in the family Cypraeidae, the cowries.

Species
Species within the genus Notadusta include:
 † Notadusta clifdenensis Cernohorsky, 1971
 † Notadusta egregia Schilder, 1937 
 † Notadusta spolongensis Schilder, 1937 
 † Notadusta trelissickensis (Suter, 1917) 
 † Notadusta victoriana (Schilder, 1935)

Species brought into synonymy 
 Notadusta boucheti Lorenz, 2002: synonym of Palmulacypraea boucheti (Lorenz, 2002) 
 Notadusta hartsmithi Schilder, 1967 : synonym of Notocypraea dissecta Iredale, 1931
 Notadusta hungerfordi (Sowerby III, 1888): synonym of Paradusta hungerfordi (G. B. Sowerby III, 1888)
 Notadusta katsuae: synonym of  Palmulacypraea katsuae (Kuroda, 1960)
 Notadusta martini (Schepman, 1907): synonym of Ransoniella martini (Schepman, 1907)
 Notadusta omii Ikeda, 1998: synonym of Palmulacypraea omii (Ikeda, 1998)
 Notadusta punctata (Linnaeus, 1771): synonym of Ransoniella punctata (Linnaeus, 1771)

References

 Schilder, M. & Schilder, F. A. (1971) A catalogue of living and fossil cowries. A taxonomy and bibliography of Triviacea and Cypraeacea (Gastropoda Prosobranchia). Institut Royal des Sciences Naturelles de Belgique, Mémoires, Deuxième Series, 85: 1-246
 Lorenz, F. & Hubert, A. 2000. A Guide to Worldwide Cowries. Hackenheim, Germany : ConchBooks pp. 1–584.

External links

Cypraeidae